High-speed grinding (HSG) is a rail care concept developed by the company Stahlberg Roensch from Seevetal, Germany.

Background 

Since roughly the beginning of the 1990s, rail network operators have experienced increasing problems with rail surface defects. Head checks, squats, corrugation and slip waves all contribute to higher maintenance costs, intensified noise pollution, traffic obstructions, and ultimately a shortened rail lifespan. These increasingly common flaws are exacerbated by the growing density and speed of both freight and passenger traffic. The direct consequence of these problems is a growing need for rail maintenance.

The primary challenge for modern rail maintenance is that less time is available to perform it due to higher traffic densities. Conventional rail maintenance machines (e.g. rail milling, planing or grinding) working at speeds from  can work only during possession time (track closure) which is in most cases available only at night.

It comes under non-traditional machining operations.

Principle 

HSG is based on the principle of circumferential grinding. Cylindrical grinding stones are pulled over the rail at an angle, inducing rotation as well as an axial grinding motion. The grinding stones are mounted on grinding units hauled by a carrier vehicle.

Two things are achieved with this motion: First, the required material removal rate is obtained through the relative motion between grinding stone and rail. Second, by rotating the stones, overheating, glazing and uneven wear of the stones is prevented.

Implementation 

Today two machines using HSG technology exist. Both are operated by Stahlberg Roensch. The larger machine, RC01, has four grinding units, each with 24 grinding stones. A smaller machine using one grinding unit with 16 grinding stones is also in use. RC01 is used on main line and high speed tracks of DB Netz AG, while the smaller version is deployed mostly on commuter and metro rail networks.

Application areas 

Preventive rail grinding
Low-friction coating removal
Acoustic grinding to reduce noise pollution emitted from the rail
Removal of the decarb layer
 rail track

Bibliography 

Hiensch, M. and Smulders, J.: Head Check Rißfortschritt in Schienen, Eisenbahntechnische Rundschau, N°. 6 (1999), pages 378-382
Grassie, S: Riffeln – Gründe und Gegenmaßnahmen, Der Eisenbahningenieur, N°. 46 (1995), pages 714-723
Lothar Marx, Dietmar Moßmann, Herrmann Kullmann: Arbeitsverfahren für die Instandhaltung des Oberbaus, Eisenbahn-Fachverlag, Heidelberg/Mainz 2003
Zarembski, Allan M.: The Art and Science of Rail Grinding, Simmons-Boardman Books, Omaha 2005
Lichterberger, Bernhard: Track Compendium – Formation, Permanent Way, Maintenance, Economics, Eurailpress in DVV Media Group, Hamburg 2005
Marcel Taubert, Aiko Püschel: High Speed Grinding passes the test in Germany, International Railway Journal, July 2009, S. 31-33

External links 
Information on High Speed Grinding from Stahlberg Roensch

Permanent way
Maintenance of way equipment